Gianni Giacomini (born 18 August 1958) is a retired Italian cyclist. In 1979 he won the amateur road race at the World Cycling Championships. Next year he competed at the 1980 Summer Olympics and finished in 5th and 18th place in the 100 km time trial and road race, respectively. In 1981 he turned professional. During his short career he suffered from a health problem (narrowing of the leg artery), and after winning Giro di Basilicata in 1983, retired from cycling.

References

1958 births
Living people
Olympic cyclists of Italy
Cyclists at the 1980 Summer Olympics
Cyclists from the Province of Treviso
Italian male cyclists